Metelen Land station is located in Metelen in the German state of North Rhine-Westphalia on the Münster–Enschede railway. The station is operated by the Metelen Land Railway Museum.

The station was opened by the Royal Westphalian Railway Company (Königlich-Westfälische Eisenbahn, KWE) on 30 September 1875, along with the Münster–Enschede railway. The station was originally called Metelen and received its current name on 1 October 1902.

Metelen Land station is served by the following Regionalbahn service:

Metelen Land Railway Museum 

The station is operated by the Eisenbahn-Interessengemeinschaft Metelen e. V. (Metelen railway community of interest, EIG). It includes, among other things, the Metelen Land Railway Museum (which has a uniform and hat collection. The station’s fully functional mechanical signal box, a section of railway track with a crossover, a local and long distance barrier, homemade hand-operated inspection trolley, a salon car, workshop wagons, track maintenance equipment, a ticket printing machine, a weighing scale with card issuance, an industrial diesel locomotive and model railways can also be viewed.

Notes 

Railway stations in North Rhine-Westphalia
Railway stations in Germany opened in 1875